Olearia fragrantissima is a species of flowering plant in the family Asteraceae. It is found only in New Zealand. It is threatened by habitat loss.

References

fragrantissima
Flora of New Zealand
Near threatened plants
Taxonomy articles created by Polbot